Rahmizâde Bahaeddin Bey (1875–1951), also known as Bahaettin Rahmi Bediz and Rahmi Bediz, was a Cretan Turk who was the first Turkish photographer by profession. He started his career in Kandiye, Crete in 1895, and went on to open photography studios in İzmir in 1910, in İstanbul in 1915 where he acquired his fame, and in Ankara after 1935 where, aside from his private business, he worked as the Chief of Photography Department in Turkish Historical Society. He was known as Rahmi Bediz after the 1934 Surname Law in Turkey.

The thousands of photographs (especially portraits) he took during his career (Crete, İzmir, İstanbul, Ankara) have immense historical value.

In 1927/1928, while based in İstanbul and managing his own photographic studio (Photo Resné), he prepared for the Municipality of İzmir the booklet "Album de Smyrne", in French and in Turkish, a collection of İzmir photographs taken by him supplemented with explanatory texts. The album, distributed abroad through Turkey's embassies and consular offices, is notable both by being one of the first information and promotion packages prepared by the young Republic of Turkey for international readership, and also for having been one of the last books printed in Turkey in Arabic script, coming shortly before the transition to Latin alphabet.

He is still revered also in Crete for having been the first to capture the people and the landscapes of the island.

His son, Pertev Bediz (Peter Bediz for Canadians) also attained prominence by becoming one of the pioneers of the geophysical industry in Canada.

Footnotes

Sources
 Girit'ten İstanbul'a Bahaettin Rahmi Bediz (Bahaettin Rahmi Bediz from Crete to İstanbul) by Seyit Ali Ak, İletişim Yayınları, 2004, İstanbul 
 Revue "İlgi" by the Turkish Historical Society 

Photographers from Istanbul
1875 births
1951 deaths
Cretan Turks
People from Crete
Photographers from the Ottoman Empire